Eyyüp Hasan Uğur (born 22 June 1977) is a retired German-born Turkish football midfielder.

Career

Statistics

References

External links

1977 births
Turkish footballers
VfL Bochum II players
VfL Bochum players
SpVgg Erkenschwick players
Rot-Weiss Essen players
Gaziantepspor footballers
Gaziantep F.K. footballers
Denizlispor footballers
Konyaspor footballers
Gençlerbirliği S.K. footballers
Çaykur Rizespor footballers
Antalyaspor footballers
Sakaryaspor footballers
Kocaelispor footballers
Altay S.K. footballers
KFC Uerdingen 05 players
Süper Lig players
TFF First League players
Living people
Association football midfielders